Mirówek  is a village in the administrative district of Gmina Mirów, within Szydłowiec County, Masovian Voivodeship, in east-central Poland.

References

Villages in Szydłowiec County